Roger Legris (3 July 1898 – 22 May 1981) was a French actor.

Selected filmography
 On the Streets (1933)
 The House on the Dune (1934)
 The Devil in the Bottle (1935)
 Counsel for Romance (1936)
 Wells in Flames (1937)
 Southern Mail (1937)
 Pépé le Moko (1937)
 Life Dances On (1937)
 Miarka (1937)
 The Lie of Nina Petrovna (1937)
 Courrier sud (1937)
 Port of Shadows (1938)
 Mollenard (1938)
 The Novel of Werther (1938)
 The West (1938)
 Vidocq (1939)
 Cristobal's Gold (1940)
 Moulin Rouge (1940)
 The Last of the Six (1941)
 Various Facts About Paris (1950)
 The Treasure of Cantenac (1950)
 Good Enough to Eat (1951)
 Robinson Crusoeland (1951)
 The Green Glove (1952)
 The Babes in the Secret Service (1956)
 A Certain Monsieur Jo (1958)
 Un drôle de paroissien (1963)
 Your Money or Your Life (1966)

External links

1898 births
1981 deaths
French male film actors
20th-century French male actors
People from Malakoff